General William Grinfield (1744/45–19 October 1803) was a British Army officer who served during the French Revolutionary and Napoleonic Wars. Grinfield joined the 3rd Regiment of Foot Guards in 1760 and was promoted through the ranks, becoming a major in the regiment in 1786. In 1793 his regiment joined the Flanders Campaign, fighting at the siege of Valenciennes and Battle of Lincelles, during which time he was promoted to lieutenant-colonel. Having held a higher army-wide rank than he did regimental rank, Grinfield was promoted by seniority to major-general later in the same year.

Grinfield continued with the 3rd Guards until 1795 when he was given a command within the Southern Military District, also becoming colonel of the 86th Regiment of Foot. He went on to command the North-West Military District before in 1798 being promoted to lieutenant-general, and in 1801 receiving command of the Midland Military District. In the following year he was made Commander-in-Chief of the Forces in the Windward and Leeward Islands. In this role he attacked French and Dutch colonies at the beginning of the Napoleonic Wars in 1803, capturing Saint Lucia, Tobago, Demerara, Essequibo, and Berbice. Promoted to general on 1 October of the same year, he died of yellow fever at Barbados only eighteen days later, aged 58.

Military career

Early service
Born in 1744 or 1745, William Grinfield joined the British Army in 1760, becoming an ensign in the 3rd Regiment of Foot Guards. He was promoted to lieutenant (regimental rank) and captain (army rank) in 1767, and then to captain and lieutenant-colonel respectively in 1776. He was promoted to colonel (army rank) in 1782. Still serving in the 3rd Foot Guards, Grinfield was promoted to major in 1786, becoming the junior of the two majors serving in the regiment. With the French Revolutionary Wars having begun in 1793, Grinfield was in command of the 1st Battalion of the 3rd Foot Guards when they joined the Flanders Campaign.

Grinfield was singled out for his "personal bravery and ability" while fighting at the siege of Valenciennes between May and July, and in early August was promoted to become lieutenant-colonel of his battalion. This made him a regimental lieutenant-colonel and an army-wide colonel. The promotion came about because the previous commanding officer of the battalion, Major-General Gustavus Guydickens, had been suspended awaiting a court martial for homosexual conduct. On 18 August Grinfield fought with his battalion at the Battle of Lincelles. Here he served as second-in-command to Major-General Gerard Lake, who commanded the Guards Brigade. Lake's 1,120 men defeated a French force of 5,000 in the battle. For his conduct during such, Grinfield was afterwards thanked by the Commander-in-Chief, the Duke of York.

Home general
Grinfield was then promoted by seniority to major-general in October. Continuing in the 3rd Foot Guards, he was criticised by members of his regiment for "a most brutal and oppressive plan of discipline", with his "unprecedented martinetism" having "discontented the whole regiment". On 20 February 1795 he was given control of the garrison at Dover, with his home in Sidmouth, commanding part of the Southern Military District. He was then made colonel of the 86th Regiment of Foot on 25 March, replacing Lieutenant-General Russell Manners and relinquishing his position as lieutenant-colonel of the 3rd Foot Guards.

By June 1798 Grinfield had moved to command the North-West Military District. He was then promoted to lieutenant-general later in the year, and in January 1801 was given command of the Midland Military District, consisting of most of Buckinghamshire and Oxfordshire with his headquarters in Lichfield. He was then on 5 June 1802 appointed Commander-in-Chief of the Forces in the Windward and Leeward Islands.

C-in-C Windward and Leeward Islands

Preparations for war
The French Revolutionary Wars had recently ended with the Peace of Amiens. Grinfield replaced Lieutenant-General Sir Thomas Trigge as Commander-in-Chief, inheriting a force of around 10,000 men, of which 3–4,000 were available for offensive military operations. The British government gave Grinfield early warning in April 1803 that the Peace was going to end, beginning the Napoleonic Wars, and in response Grinfield began to prepare for operations, bringing together supplies and troopships for his men. Word came to the West Indies in mid-June that Britain was again at war with France, and Grinfield was ordered to 
begin a campaign against the hostile neighbouring islands.

Working in cooperation with Commodore Samuel Hood, Commander-in-Chief Leeward Islands Station, Grinfield's force set sail from Barbados on 20 June. Among his senior officers Grinfield had Brigadier-General George Prévost as his second-in-command, alongside Brigadier-General Thomas Picton and Lieutenant-Colonel Edward Pakenham. The force was 3,149 men strong, including the second battalion of the 1st Regiment of Foot and the 64th, 68th, and 3rd West Indies regiments. While initial orders had expected Grinfield to attack Martinique, this was a heavily defended island that would have required 10,000 men to attack, and so Grinfield and Hood chose to attack other locations.

Capture of Saint Lucia and Tobago
Grinfield first attacked the French island of Saint Lucia. This was to ensure that the French could not continue to resupply and fortify the island. His force landed in Choc Bay on 21 June, and at 5:30 a.m. advanced through the nearby French outposts and captured Castries. The French commander, Brigadier Antoine Noguès, was then requested to surrender, but he refused. In response Grinfield stormed Morne Fortune fort at 4 a.m. the next day. This attack was made by two columns of troops, commanded respectively by the brigadiers Picton and Robert Brereton, and after half an hour of fighting the fort was taken, with the British suffering 138 casualties. The force took 640 French soldiers prisoner and sent them back to France, although Noguès became friendly with Grinfield and received permission to go to Martinique instead.

Brereton was left to hold Saint Lucia with the 68th and three companies of the 3rd West Indies Regiment. Grinfield moved on with the rest of his expedition, attacking Tobago five days later. The island was commanded by Brigadier-General César Berthier, who was forced to surrender on 1 July after Grinfield made a quick advance on his capital Scarborough with two columns of soldiers. Grinfield sent Berthier and his 200 soldiers back to France, having completed his attack without receiving a single casualty. The capture of Tobago at this stage stopped French plans to reinforce it, which would have seen Berthier build a strong naval depot guarded by a garrison of 1,200 men.

Surrender of the Dutch colonies

Having left eight companies from the 1st and another one from the 3rd West Indies as garrison on Tobago, Grinfield returned to Barbados. This was to ensure that his force was not too thinly spread to respond to any French counterattacks from Martinique or Guadeloupe, with Antigua having refused to create a militia to help defend itself. The Dutch colonies in the West Indies, nominally controlled by the Batavian Republic, were wary of the bloodshed that might come to them if they were invaded, having been visited by the French colonial governor Victor Hughes in early July, and they requested to Britain that they be peacefully taken over by Grinfield. He received his orders on 10 August to go and accept the surrender of the Dutch governors, and a week later the Batavian Republic joined with France against Britain, making Grinfield's path to capture them more simple. Despite this Grinfield was worried about any further offensive actions, with much of his expeditionary force already used up as garrisons of the newly captured French islands. He requested that 5,000 more men be sent out to supplement his force.

Grinfield was promised that a battalion would be sent to him from Gibraltar, but neither this nor any other reinforcements were provided. He waited for any arrivals until the end of August and then decided that an attack had to take place despite his smaller force. He supplemented it with Royal Marines and on 1 September set out again in conjunction with Hood, with his force 1,300 men strong. This was mostly made up of the 64th and parts of the 3rd, 7th, and 11th West Indies. Grinfield first sailed to Demerara because he expected that surrender to be entirely peaceful. Arriving on 16 September at Georgetown he sent an offer to the governor. On 19 September his force took control of Demerara and Essequibo without bloodshed, the local commanders having surrendered on board the 22-gun post ship HMS Heureux the day before.

Later in the same day 550 men were sent on to Berbice, which was under the control of a different commander. There a flag of truce was organised and a committee was received to surrender the island, but the Dutch garrison commander refused to capitulate without discussion with his officers. Eventually agreement was found and the British took control on 25 September, capturing the 600-strong garrison. The operation was completed without loss to the British. Of the 1,500 Dutch soldiers in garrison on the three colonies half of them chose to join Grinfield, becoming the York Light Infantry Volunteers. Grinfield was promoted to general on 1 October.

Death

Some time after the capture of Berbice Grinfield returned to Barbados from Georgetown. Throughout this time sickness had been rife in Grinfield's force, with around 700 men having died. Grinfield was not immune to this, and at Barbados he was attacked by a bout of yellow fever, of which his wife died on 16 October and he on 19 October, aged 58. Grinfield was replaced as Commander-in-Chief by Major-General Sir Charles Green who went on with Hood to capture Suriname in 1804. Grinfield left almost everything in his will to his younger brother Thomas (died 1824), a clergyman in Bristol.

Notes and citations

Notes

Citations

References

 
 
 
 
 
 
 
 
 
 
 
 
 
 
 
 
 
 

|-

1803 deaths
British Army generals
British Army personnel of the French Revolutionary Wars
British Army commanders of the Napoleonic Wars
Scots Guards officers